Ibrahimi may refer to:
 Ahmed Taleb Ibrahimi
 Ebrahimi
 Ibrahim Ibrahimi
 Ibrahimi, Iran (disambiguation)